The 2017 Spanish Athletics Championships was the 97th edition of the national championship in outdoor track and field for Spain. It was held on 22 and 23 July at the Estadio Joan Serrahima in Barcelona. It served as the selection meeting for Spain at the 2017 World Championships in Athletics.

The club championships in relays and combined track and field events were contested separately from the main competition.

Results

Men

Women

Notes

References
Results
XCVII Campeonato de España Absoluto . Royal Spanish Athletics Federation. Retrieved 2019-06-28.

External links 
 Official website of the Royal Spanish Athletics Federation 

2017
Spanish Athletics Championships
Spanish Championships
Athletics Championships
Sports competitions in Barcelona